Annulohypoxylon thouarsianum is a species of ascomycete fungus.

Description 
The species grows on the bark of hardwood trees. Its fruiting body is sessile, and ranges from 1 to 3 centimeters wide. The surface of the fruiting body is dark brown or black and has a rough texture due to the high number of perithecia.

Range 
Annulohypoxylon thouarsianum is most commonly found in the Eastern United States, along the United States' West Coast, and in Mexico.

Taxonomy 
The species was moved from the genus Hypoxylon to Annulohypoxylon in 2005. The following varieties are recognized: 

 A. t. macrosporum
 A. t. thouarsianum

References 

Xylariales
Fungi of North America
Taxa named by Joseph-Henri Léveillé